Keep Looking Up, released in 1986 on Tyscot Records, is the debut gospel music album by American contemporary gospel music group Witness. It was the only album to feature fifth member Marvie Wright, who departed after the album's release.

Track listing
 "Your Blessing On Its Way"
 "Keep Looking Up"
 "Oh How He Loves Us"
 "He Paid The Price"
 "Give Your Life To Jesus"
 "That One Is Jesus"
 "Glory To His Name"
 "Higher Ground"

Personnel
Lisa Page Brooks: Vocals
Tina Brooks: Vocals
Diane Campbell: Vocals
Yolanda Harris: Vocals
Marvie Wright: Vocals

References

External links
http://www.discogs.com/Witness-Keep-Looking-Up/release/3591980
http://www.gospelflava.com/articles/witness-discography.html

1987 debut albums
Witness (gospel group) albums